It's a Business was a television sitcom that aired on the DuMont Television Network for 10 episodes.

Broadcast history
It's a Business aired on DuMont from March 19 to May 21, 1952, replacing Famous Jury Trials, and was a half-hour program that aired on Wednesdays at 9 pm. The series starred Bob Haymes and Leo De Lyon as Broadway song publishers in the 1900s, during the vaudeville era, and Dorothy Loudon as their secretary.

Production 
The program was directed by Frank Bunetta and written by Bob Weiskopf. Paul Rosen was the producer. Mort Lindsey directed the music It was broadcast live from the Adelphi Theatre in New York City.

Episode status
As with most DuMont series, no episodes are known to survive.

See also 
 List of programs broadcast by the DuMont Television Network
 List of surviving DuMont Television Network broadcasts

References

Bibliography
David Weinstein, The Forgotten Network: DuMont and the Birth of American Television (Philadelphia: Temple University Press, 2004)

External links 
 It's a Business at IMDb
 DuMont historical website

1952 American television series debuts
1952 American television series endings
Black-and-white American television shows
DuMont Television Network original programming
Lost television shows